Thomas Onslow may refer to:

 Thomas Onslow, 2nd Baron Onslow (1679–1740), British politician and landowner
 Thomas Onslow, 2nd Earl of Onslow (1754–1827), English nobleman and courtier
 Thomas Cranley Onslow (1778–1861), British politician and soldier
 Thomas Frederick Onslow (1821–1883), English cricketer